Menuet za kitaro is a novel by Slovenian author Vitomil Zupan. It was first published in 1975.

See also
List of Slovenian novels

Slovenian novels
1975 novels
Novels set in Yugoslavia